Shanon Slack (born April 23, 1983) is an American mixed martial artist who competes in Bellator's featherweight division.

Background
Slack lived his early life in Chicago, but his family moved to Richmond, Virginia when he was in the 6th grade. In wrestling, he was a high school All American as a senior, wrestled at Cerritos College where he won All-American honors and the California JUCO title then Fresno State and Old Dominion and trained at the Olympic Training Center.

After the 2008 Olympic trials, Slack moved to California and began working as a financial analyst. Soon after, he gained interest in mixed martial arts and met Dominick Cruz. He trained with Cruz in California at the Alliance MMA then went on to coach top MMA fighters Junior Dos Santos, Rodrigo Noguiera, and Rogerio Noguiera in Brazil. Then, in 2009 he was invited to train at Black House, a Brazilian fighting team.

Slack was also one of the coaches of Team Cruz in The Ultimate Fighter: Live.

Mixed martial arts career

Early career
Slack started his professional career in 2009. He compiled three straight victories in two years, before signing with Bellator in 2012.

Bellator MMA
Slack made his debut against Booker Arthur on May 18, 2012 at Bellator 69. He won via unanimous decision.

Slack faced Matt McCook on July 20, 2012 at Bellator 72. Slack had his first career's defeat via split decision (29-28 McCook, 29-28 Slack, 29-28 McCook).

Slack faced Sky Moiseichik on November 9, 2012 at Bellator 80. He won via unanimous decision.

Slack faced Josh Tyler on February 21, 2013 at Bellator 90. Tyler was defeated via submission due to a Peruvian necktie in the third round.

Championships and accomplishments

Amateur wrestling
USA Wrestling
University Greco-Roman Wrestling National Championships 141 lb: 3rd place out of Old Dominion University (2005)
National Association of Intercollegiate Athletics
Virginia Intercollegiate Championship 141 lb: Champion out of Old Dominion University (2006)
National Junior College Athletic Association
JUCO National Championship 141 lb: Champion out of Cerritos College (2002)
California Community College Wrestling
California Community College Wrestling Championships 141 lb: Champion out of Cerritos College (2002)
University Wrestling National Championships 2006 4th place

Mixed martial arts record

|-
|Win
|align=center|6–1
|Josh Tyler
|Submission (Peruvian necktie)
|Bellator 90
|
|align=center|3
|align=center|1:56
|Salt Lake City, Utah, United States
|
|-
|Win
|align=center|5–1
|Sky Moiseichik
|Decision (unanimous)
|Bellator 80
|
|align=center|3
|align=center|5:00
|Hollywood, Florida, United States
|150 lb catchweight bout.
|-
|Loss
|align=center|4–1
|Matt McCook
|Decision (split)
|Bellator 72
|
|align=center|3
|align=center|5:00
|Tampa, Florida, United States
|
|-
|Win
|align=center|4–0
|Booker Arthur
|Decision (unanimous)
|Bellator 69
|
|align=center|3
|align=center|5:00
|Lake Charles, Louisiana, United States
|
|-
|Win
|align=center|3–0
|James Smith
|TKO (punches)
|CFC 8: Seasons Beatings
|
|align=center|1
|align=center|1:36
|Lincoln, Nebraska, United States
|
|-
|Win
|align=center|2–0
|Kevin Benson
|TKO (punches)
|Disorderly Conduct 2: The Return
|
|align=center|1
|align=center|2:05
|Omaha, Nebraska, United States
|
|-
|Win
|align=center|1–0
|Noe Quintanilla
|Decision (unanimous)
|Iron Will Fighting Championship 2
|
|align=center|3
|align=center|5:00
|Johnstown, Pennsylvania, United States
|

References

External links
 
 

1983 births
Living people
American male sport wrestlers
Amateur wrestlers
American male mixed martial artists
Featherweight mixed martial artists
Mixed martial artists utilizing collegiate wrestling
Bellator male fighters
Old Dominion University alumni
Mixed martial artists from California
Sportspeople from Orange County, California